Aquimarina versatilis is a Gram-negative, aerobic and rod-shaped bacterium from the genus of Aquimarina which has been isolated from seashore sand from Jeju island in Korea.

References

External links
Type strain of Aquimarina versatilis at BacDive -  the Bacterial Diversity Metadatabase

Flavobacteria
Bacteria described in 2017